The article lists all the 113 tehsils in the 13 districts of Uttarakhand.

District-wise details

See also
 Administrative divisions of Uttarakhand
 List of districts of Uttarakhand
 List of parganas of Uttarakhand
 List of community development blocks of Uttarakhand
 List of subdistricts in India

References
 
 

Tehsils
Uttarakhand
Geography of Uttarakhand
Uttarakhand